Sir Kenneth Charles Calman,  HonFAcadMEd (born 25 December 1941) is a doctor and academic who formerly worked as a surgeon, oncologist and cancer researcher and held the position of Chief Medical Officer of Scotland, and then England. He was Warden and Vice-Chancellor of Durham University from 1998 to 2006 before becoming Chancellor of the University of Glasgow. He held the position of Chair of the National Cancer Research Institute from 2008 until 2011. From 2008 to 2009, he was convener of the Calman Commission on Scottish devolution.

Early life
Kenneth Calman was born on 25 December 1941 to Grace Douglas Don and Arthur McIntosh Calman. He was educated at Allan Glen's School and the University of Glasgow. He began medical training and took an intercalated BSc in biochemistry while studying for his MB ChB, the general medical degree. He undertook a PhD in dermatology and also received an MD with Honours in organ preservation.

He became Hall Fellow and Lecturer in Surgery at the University in 1969, and between 1972–74, was a clinical research fellow at the Chester Beatty Research Institute in London, funded by the Medical Research Council. 

In 1974, he was appointed to the Chair of Clinical Oncology and became Dean of Postgraduate Medicine at The University of Glasgow in 1984.

Career
Calman was appointed Chief Medical Officer for Scotland, at the Scottish Office in 1989.  He was then appointed Chief Medical Officer for England, by the United Kingdom government, at the Department of Health in 1991–98, a period that included the BSE crisis.

He was the UK Representative at the World Health Organisation and chaired its Executive Committee 1988/9.

In 1998, he was appointed Vice-Chancellor and Warden of Durham University. His time as vice-chancellor saw the expansion and integration of the campus at Stockton-on-Tees, with two colleges being established there in 2001 and the campus being renamed Queen's Campus during the 2003 Golden Jubilee celebrations. A new college was also opened in 2006, Josephine Butler College. There was also a return to the teaching of medicine at Durham, with students doing their pre-clinical studies at Queen's Campus before transferring to Newcastle to complete the clinical part of their degrees. His time as vice-chancellor also saw the closure of the Department of Applied Linguistics in 2003 and Department of East Asian Studies in 2007. Professor Calman retired as Warden in 2006 and was succeeded by Professor Christopher Higgins.

Calman was a member of the Nuffield Council on Bioethics from 2000–2008. He chaired its inquiry on the Ethics of research related to healthcare in developing countries from 2000–2002, and was a member of the Working Party on Public health from 2006–2007.

On 23 January 2006, it was announced Calman had been elected Chancellor of the University of Glasgow by the General Council of the University, taking around 60 percent of the vote against opponent Professor Sir Neil MacCormick, a former MEP,  jurist and son of John MacCormick, former Rector of the University.

Calman was Chair of the Board of Trustees of the National Trust for Scotland from 2010 to 2015. On 1 October 2016 he took up the position of Chair of the Board of National Library of Scotland.

He has written 15 books, mainly on medical topics, and many papers on medicine, health and science.

Calman Commission

Calman was the chair of a commission established by the Scottish Parliament in March 2008 to review Scottish devolution, commonly referred to as the Calman Commission. Other Commission members include former Lord Advocate Colin Boyd, former Deputy First Minister Jim Wallace, and Mona Siddiqui, Professor of Islamic Studies at the University of Glasgow. The Commission published its first interim report in December 2008, and published its final report on 15 June 2009. The Commission recommended, amongst other things, that the Scottish Parliament receive greater tax-raising powers as well as control over the regulation of airguns, the administration of elections, drink-driving limits and the national speed limit.

Honours and awards
Calman has received honorary degrees from the universities of Glasgow, Strathclyde, Aberdeen, Nottingham, Newcastle, Birmingham, Stirling, Paisley, Westminster and Brighton, the Open University and Glasgow Caledonian University.

He became a Fellow of the Royal Society of Edinburgh in 1979. He was made a Knight Commander of the Order of the Bath. He is an Honorary Fellow of the Academy of Medical Educators.
 He is a Deputy Lieutenant in the City of Glasgow.

He holds fellowships of several Royal Colleges including 
 Fellow of the Royal College of Surgeons of Edinburgh, 1971
 Fellow of the Royal College of Physicians, 1985
 Fellow of the Royal College of Physicians of Edinburgh, 1989
 Fellow of the Royal College of Physicians and Surgeons of Glasgow, 1989
 Fellow of the Faculty of Public Health, 1989

Personal life
He was President of The Boys' Brigade from 2007 until 2012, and addressed his first Council meeting as President at Tulliallan Castle in September 2008.

He likes to write poetry. In 2013 he graduated MLitt at the University of Glasgow with a thesis on Scottish Literature and medicine. This was subsequently published as a book, A Doctor's Line in 2014.

He married Ann Wilkie in 1967, and has a son and two daughters, one of whom is the comedian Susan Calman. He enjoys collecting cartoons and sundials.

References

External links 
 Kenneth Calman: The cautious doctor (BBC)
 
 BBC News: Devolution Review Body Launched
 Appointment as Deputy Lieutenant

1941 births
Academics of the University of Glasgow
People educated at Allan Glen's School
Alumni of the University of Glasgow
Chancellors of the University of Glasgow
Chief Medical Officers for England
Chief Medical Officers for Scotland
Fellows of the Royal College of Surgeons
Fellows of the Royal Society of Edinburgh
Fellows of the Royal College of General Practitioners
Knights Commander of the Order of the Bath
Living people
Medical doctors from Glasgow
20th-century Scottish medical doctors
21st-century Scottish medical doctors
Scottish surgeons
Vice-Chancellors and Wardens of Durham University
Fellows of the Royal College of Physicians and Surgeons of Glasgow
Honorary Fellows of the Academy of Medical Educators
Deputy Lieutenants of Glasgow
20th-century surgeons